The 28th Golden Melody Awards took place in Taipei, Taiwan in 2017. The award ceremony for the popular music categories was hosted by Mickey Huang and broadcast on TTV on 24 June.

Winners and nominees
Below is the list of winners and nominees for the popular music categories.

References

External links

Golden Melody Awards
Golden Melody Awards
Golden Melody Awards
Golden Melody Awards